Elena Tyurina-Batukhtina (born 12 April 1971 in Sverdlovsk) is a retired female volleyball player from Russia, who made her debut for the Soviet national team in 1989. She competed consecutively in four Olympic Games. She was part of the Soviet and Russian national teams and became European Champion in 1989, 1991, 1993, 1997 and 2001. On club level she played with Uralochka Ekaterinburg

Clubs
 Uralochka Ekaterinburg (1994)

Honours
 1989 European Championship — 1st place
 1989 World Cup — 2nd place
 1990 World Championship — 1st place
 1991 European Championship — 1st place
 1991 World Cup — 3rd place
 1992 Olympic Games — 2nd place
 1993 FIVB World Grand Prix — 3rd place
 1993 European Championship — 1st place
 1993 World Grand Champions Cup — 2nd place
 1994 World Championship — 3rd place
 1995 European Championship — 3rd place
 1996 FIVB World Grand Prix — 3rd place
 1997 FIVB World Grand Prix — 1st place
 1997 European Championship — 1st place
 1997 World Grand Champions Cup — 1st place
 2000 FIVB World Grand Prix — 2nd place
 2000 Olympic Games — 2nd place
 2001 FIVB World Grand Prix — 3rd place
 2001 European Championship — 1st place
 2001 World Grand Champions Cup — 2nd place
 2002 World Championship — 3rd place
 2003 FIVB World Grand Prix — 2nd place
 2004 Olympic Games — 2nd place

Individual awards
 1994 World Championship "Best Scorer"
 1997 FIVB World Grand Prix "Most Valuable Player"
 2001 FIVB World Grand Prix "Best Receiver"

References

 Profile

1971 births
Living people
Russian women's volleyball players
Soviet women's volleyball players
Volleyball players at the 1992 Summer Olympics
Volleyball players at the 1996 Summer Olympics
Volleyball players at the 2000 Summer Olympics
Volleyball players at the 2004 Summer Olympics
Olympic volleyball players of the Unified Team
Olympic volleyball players of Russia
Olympic silver medalists for the Unified Team
Olympic silver medalists for Russia
Olympic medalists in volleyball
Medalists at the 2004 Summer Olympics
Sportspeople from Yekaterinburg
Medalists at the 2000 Summer Olympics
Medalists at the 1992 Summer Olympics
Goodwill Games medalists in volleyball
Competitors at the 1994 Goodwill Games